Devario affinis  is a freshwater cyprinid fish found in India, which grows up to  in length.

References

External links
 Devario affinis

Devario
Fish described in 1860
Taxa named by Edward Blyth